Kévin Bouly (born April 26, 1981) is a French male weightlifter, competing in the 94 kg category and representing France at international competitions. He participated in the men's 94 kg event  at the 2015 World Weightlifting Championships, and at the 2016 Summer Olympics, finishing in twelfth position.

Major results

References

1981 births
Living people
French male weightlifters
People from Langres
Weightlifters at the 2016 Summer Olympics
Olympic weightlifters of France
Sportspeople from Haute-Marne